The San Bernabe AVA is an American Viticultural Area located in southern Monterey County, California.  It is part of the larger Monterey AVA.  San Bernabe is located in the Salinas Valley, between the Salinas River on the east, and the Santa Lucia Mountains on the west.  To the north of the appellation is Pine Canyon and to the south is the San Lucas AVA.

The San Bernabe AVA was created in 2004 as a result of a petition by Delicato Family Vineyards, whose  make it the largest in the region.

San Bernabe vineyard
The San Bernabe Vineyard is part of the San Bernabe American Viticultural Area in Monterey County, California.

References

American Viticultural Areas
American Viticultural Areas of California
Salinas Valley
Geography of Monterey County, California
2004 establishments in California